Racine County (sometimes also ) is a county in southeastern Wisconsin. As of the 2020 census, its population was 197,727, making it Wisconsin's fifth-most populous county. Its county seat is Racine. The county was founded in 1836, then a part of the Wisconsin Territory. Racine County comprises the Racine metropolitan statistical area. This area is part of the Milwaukee-Racine-Waukesha combined statistical area. The county's unemployment rate was 5.6% in June 2021.

History
The Potawatomi people occupied the area of Racine County until European settlement. The Wisconsin Territory legislature established Racine County in 1836, separating it from Milwaukee County. Racine County originally extended to Wisconsin's southern border and encompassed the land that is now Kenosha County, Wisconsin. Kenosha County was created as a separate entity in 1850.

Geography
 Milwaukee County (north)
 Ottawa County, Michigan (northeast)
 Allegan County, Michigan (southeast)
 Kenosha County (south)
 Walworth County (west)
 Waukesha County (northwest)

The Root River is the county's namesake.

Demographics

2020 census
As of the census of 2020, the population was 197,727. The racial makeup of the county was 72.0% White, 11.8% Black or African American, 1.2% Asian, 0.5% Native American, 5.4% from other races, and 9.0% from two or more races. Ethnically, the population was 14.1% Hispanic or Latino of any race.

2000 census
As of the census of 2000, there were 188,831 people, 70,819 households, and 49,856 families residing in the county.  The population density was 567 people per square mile (219/km2). There were 74,718 housing units at an average density of 224 per square mile (87/km2). The racial makeup of the county was 83.04% White, 10.47% Black or African American, 0.36% Native American, 0.72% Asian, 0.04% Pacific Islander, 3.69% from other races, and 1.67% from two or more races. 7.94% of the population were Hispanic or Latino of any race. 32.9% were of German, 7.4% Polish and 5.5% Irish ancestry.

There were 70,819 households, of which 34.5% had children under 18 living with them, 54.0% were married couples living together, 12.3% had a female householder with no husband present, and 29.6% were non-families. 24.5% of all households were made up of individuals, and 9.2% had someone living alone who was 65 or older. The average household size was 2.59 and the average family size was 3.09.

In the county, the population was spread out, with 27.0% under 18, 8.3% from 18 to 24, 29.9% from 25 to 44, 22.5% from 45 to 64, and 12.3% who were 65 or older. The median age was 36. For every 100 females there were 98.0 males. For every 100 females 18 and over, there were 95.5 males.

Transportation

Major highways

Railroads
Amtrak
Canadian National
Canadian Pacific
Union Pacific
Sturtevant station

Buses
Ryde Racine
List of intercity bus stops in Wisconsin

Airports
 John H. Batten Airport (KRAC) serves the county and surrounding communities.
 Burlington Municipal Airport (KBUU) enhances county service.
 Cindy Guntly Memorial Airport (62C) enhances county service.
 Fox River Airport (96C) enhances county service.
 Sylvania Airport (C89) enhances county service.

Communities

Cities
 Burlington (partly in Walworth County)
 Racine (county seat)

Villages

 Caledonia
 Elmwood Park
 Mount Pleasant
 North Bay
 Raymond
 Rochester
 Sturtevant
 Union Grove
 Waterford
 Wind Point
 Yorkville

Towns
 Burlington
 Dover
 Norway
 Waterford

Census-designated places
 Bohners Lake (Town of Burlington)
 Browns Lake (Town of Burlington)
 Eagle Lake (Town of Dover)
 Tichigan (Town of Waterford)
 Wind Lake (Town of Norway)

Unincorporated communities

 Beaumont
 Buena Park
 Caldwell
 Cedar Park
 Eagle Lake Manor
 Eagle Lake Terrace
 Franksville
 Honey Creek (partial)
 Honey Lake (partial)
 Husher
 Ives Grove
 Kansasville
 Kneeland
 North Cape
 Raymond
 Rosewood
 Sylvania
 Union Church
 Yorkville

Ghost towns/neighborhoods
 DeNoon
 Muskego Settlement
 Raymond Center

Government

The County Board has 21 members, each elected from single-member districts. The county executive is elected in a countywide vote. The county executive is Jonathan Delagrave. The Circuit Court is made up of ten judges, elected in countywide elections to six-year terms.

Politics
Racine County has been a bellwether county, having voted for the winning presidential candidate in 28 of the last 33 elections since 1896 despite its solidly Democratic county seat, Racine, Wisconsin. The only exceptions to this were when it voted for Charles Evans Hughes in 1916, Gerald Ford in 1976, Michael Dukakis in 1988, and Donald Trump in 2020.

See also
 Peggy Johnson, a young woman whose body was discovered in 1999 in Raymond
 National Register of Historic Places listings in Racine County, Wisconsin

References

Further reading
 Commemorative Biographical Record of Prominent and Representative Men of Racine and Kenosha Counties Wisconsin. Chicago: J. H. Beers, 1906.

External links
 
 Racine County map from the Wisconsin Department of Transportation

 
1836 establishments in Wisconsin Territory
Populated places established in 1836